Donny Gorter (born 15 June 1988) is a Dutch professional footballer who plays as a left back for amateur side RKSV Halsteren. He formerly played for NAC Breda, AZ, AaB, Viborg FF and ADO Den Haag. He is the son of former footballer Edwin Gorter.

Career 
Gorter's first season with AaB ended when he tore his cruciate ligament in the last Europa League group game against Rio Ave on 11 December 2014.

International career
Gorter was a youth international for the Netherlands.

Career statistics

Honours

Club
AZ
KNVB Cup: 2012-13

References

External links
 Voetbal International profile 
 

1988 births
Living people
Dutch footballers
Netherlands youth international footballers
Netherlands under-21 international footballers
Swiss men's footballers
Swiss people of Dutch descent
Dutch expatriate footballers
Association football midfielders
PSV Eindhoven players
NAC Breda players
AZ Alkmaar players
AaB Fodbold players
Viborg FF players
ADO Den Haag players
Danish Superliga players
Eredivisie players
Dutch expatriate sportspeople in Denmark
Expatriate men's footballers in Denmark
Sportspeople from Rucphen
Sportspeople from Lugano
RKSV Halsteren players
Footballers from North Brabant